Épaule du Bouchet is a mountain of Savoie, France. It lies in the Vanoise Massif range. It has an elevation of 3,250 metres above sea level.

Alpine three-thousanders
Mountains of the Alps
Mountains of Savoie